Cissampelopsis is a genus of flowering plants in the daisy family, native to India, China, and Southeast Asia.

 Species
 Cissampelopsis ansteadii - Tamil Nadu
 Cissampelopsis buimalia - Yunnan, Mizoram, Bhutan, Sikkim, Nepal
 Cissampelopsis calcadensis - Tamil Nadu
 Cissampelopsis corifolia - Yunnan, Tibet, Meghalaya, Sikkim, West Bengal, Assam, Myanmar
 Cissampelopsis corymbosa - Andhra Pradesh, Kerala, Madhya Pradesh, Tamil Nadu, Sri Lanka
 Cissampelopsis erythrochaeta - Hunan
 Cissampelopsis glandulosa - Yunnan
 Cissampelopsis pareira - Myanmar 
 Cissampelopsis spelaeicola - Yunnan, Guizhou, Sichuan, Guangxi
 Cissampelopsis volubilis - Yunnan, Guizhou, Guangxi, Hainan, Assam, Manipur, Meghalaya, India, Myanmar, Thailand, Peninsular Malaysia, Sumatra
 Cissampelopsis walkeri - Kerala, Tamil Nadu, Sri Lanka

References

External links 

Senecioneae
Asteraceae genera